Drâa-Bellouan is a town in modern Tunisia.

Drâa-Bellouan was known during the Roman Empire as Cabarsussi a civitas of the Roman province of Byzacena.

References

Former Roman Catholic dioceses in Africa
Roman towns and cities in Tunisia
Ancient Berber cities
Archaeological sites in Tunisia
Catholic titular sees in Africa